Jeana is a feminine given name. Notable people with the name include:

 Jeana Keough (born 1955), American television personality, realtor, actress, and model
 Jeana Varnell, survivor of American Airlines Flight 1420
 Jeana Yeager (born 1952), American aviator

Feminine given names